United States Army Forces in the Far East (USAFFE) (Filipino: Hukbong Katihan ng Estados Unidos sa Malayong Silangan/HKEUMS; Spanish: Fuerzas del Ejército de los Estados Unidos en el Lejano Oriente) was a military formation of the United States Army active from 1941 to 1946. The new command's headquarters was created on 26 July 1941, at No. 1, Calle Victoria, Manila, Luzon, the Philippines, with General Douglas MacArthur as commander. The Chief of Staff was Brigadier General Richard K. Sutherland and the Deputy Chief of Staff was Lieutenant Colonel Richard J. Marshall. The core of this command (including MacArthur, Marshall, and Sutherland) was drawn from the Office of the Military Advisor to the Commonwealth Government of the Philippines.

Creation of this command led to the subordination of the headquarters of the Philippine Department of the U.S. Army, as a service command, since planning and tactical control were now under USAFFE control. MacArthur explains, "It became an administrative echelon. It was analogous to a corps area". MacArthur recommended that Philippine Department commander Major General Grunert be reassigned, as his services were no longer needed. On 23 October, Grunert returned to the United States and MacArthur was temporarily appointed as the Philippine Department's commander.

History
In January 1941, the intelligence officer (G-2) of the Philippine Department had recommended, to his superior in Washington, D.C., that an American high command in the Far East be created, with the commander of the Philippine Department as the designated commander of said command. It does not appear this idea was seriously considered until Douglas MacArthur suggested, to the Army Chief of Staff, that such a command be created with MacArthur as the Far Eastern Commander.

On 6 June, Acting Chief of the War Plans Division Brigadier General Leonard T. Gerow noted that he saw no need for such a command, as US Forces in the Far East were concentrated in the Philippines. As such, Gerow argued that should a "crisis" occur, then MacArthur should become the commander of, not some new command, but rather, of the Philippine Department itself.

On 20 June, Army Chief of Staff George C. Marshall informed MacArthur, "Both the Secretary of War (Stimson) and I are much concerned about the situation in the Far East. Your qualifications and experience make you the logical selection for the Army Commander in the Far East should the situation approach a crisis. The Secretary has delayed recommending your appointment as he does not feel the time has arrived for such action. At the proper time, he will recommend to the President that you be so appointed."

On 17 July, Gerow made the following recommendations:

 The President should call into the service of the United States all organized military forces of the Commonwealth of the Philippines;
 General MacArthur should be called to active duty as a Major General and assigned as commander of Army Forces in the Far East;
 $10,000,000, from the President's Emergency Fund should be allotted to cover the costs of mobilization and training of the Philippine Army;
 Training of the Philippine Army be financed from the sugar excise fund, or from other funds; and
 425 U.S. Army reserve officers be sent to the Philippines to assist in mobilization and training.

On 25 July, Secretary of War Henry L. Stimson requested that President Roosevelt issue orders calling the military forces of the Commonwealth into active service for the United States. Stimson explains, "All practical steps should be taken to increase the defensive strength of the Philippine Islands". 

The following day, Roosevelt froze all Japanese assets within the United States and issued the orders to absorb the forces of the Philippine Army. That same day, the War Department created the USAFFE command, with jurisdiction over the Philippine Department and the military forces of Commonwealth of the Philippines (seemingly principally the Philippine Army, with two regular and ten reserve divisions). At the same time, MacArthur was recalled to active duty, with the rank of lieutenant general, as the USAFFE commander, from his positions as military advisor to the Philippine government and Field Marshal of the Philippine Army.

Following the Japanese invasion of the Philippines in December 1941, the short-lived American-British-Dutch-Australian Command (ABDACOM) was formed on 1 January 1942, to control all Allied forces in South East Asia and the South West Pacific. ABDACOM nominally controlled USAFFE forces, although the latter was effectively an independent force.

In March, due to the worsening Allied position in Asia and the Pacific, Roosevelt ordered MacArthur to relocate his command to Australia. MacArthur's famous speech regarding the Philippines, in which he said, "I came out of Bataan and I shall return" was made on 20 March at Terowie, South Australia during his first contact with press in Australia . General Jonathan Wainwright officially assumed control of the remaining forces in the Philippines, now known as United States Forces in the Philippines (USFIP) on 23 March.

On 18 April 1942, ABDACOM was replaced by General Headquarters (GHQ), Southwest Pacific Area (SWPA) in Melbourne, including USFIP. MacArthur was appointed Supreme Commander, SWPA. USFIP, with the exception of some ad hoc guerilla and resistance outfits, had surrendered to Japanese by 8 May.

MacArthur formally reconstituted USAFFE in Australia in February 1943, to assume responsibility for all administrative staff duties pertaining to U.S. Army units in the SWPA, as well as control of guerrilla forces in the Philippines.

On 20 October 1944, the recapture of the Philippines commenced when Allied forces landed in Leyte Gulf. The campaign was declared completed on 4 July 1945.

USAFFE was formally dissolved in the lead-up to Philippine independence on 4 July 1946.

Order of battle

31 July 1941 
Total Strength—22,532 (1,434 officers—21,098 enlisted, including 11,937 Philippine Scouts)

 USAFFE Headquarters (5)
 Philippine Department Headquarters (289)
 Philippine Division (10,473)
 Harbor Defenses of Manila and Subic Bays (5,360)
 Philippine Army Air Corps (2,407)
 26th Cavalry Regiment (838)
 43rd Infantry Regiment (329)
 86th Field Artillery Battalion (PS)(388)
 88th Field Artillery Regiment (PS)(518)
 808th Military Police Company (69)
 Service Detachments (1,836)
 Other (20)

30 November 1941 
Total Strength: 31,095 (2,504 officers and 28,591 enlisted, including 11,957 Philippine Scouts)

 USAFFE Headquarters (61)
 Philippine Department (553)
 North Luzon Force (38)
 South Luzon Force (10)
 Visayan-Mindanao Force (9)
 Philippine Division (10,233)
 Harbor Defenses of Manila and Subic Bays (5,225)
 Far East Air Force (5,609)
 26th Cavalry Regiment (PS)(842)
 43d Infantry Regiment (PS)(328)
 86th Field Artillery Battalion (PS)(395)
 88th Field Artillery Regiment (PS)(538)
 200th Coast Artillery (AA) Regiment (1,809)
 192nd Tank Battalion (588)
 194th Tank Battalion (410)
 808th Military Police Company (160)
 Service Detachments (4,268)
 Other (19)

Awards
USAFFE received four Distinguished Unit Citations (later converted to Presidential Unit Citations) for the following time periods -
 7 December 1941 to 10 May 1942 (WD GO 22-42 amended by DA GO 46-48)
 8 to 31 December 1941 (WD GO 14-42)
 12 January to 14 February 1942 (WD GO 32-42)
 21 January 1942 (WD GO 14-42) 

USAFFE also received the Philippine Presidential Unit Citation.

See also
Asiatic Fleet
Military History of the Philippines
Military History of the United States

References

External links
Timeline, Philippine Archives Collection, National Archives 
U.S. Army Forces, Far East, HyperWar
USAFFE December 1941, World War II Armed Forces — Orders of Battle and Organizations, Niehorster.org 
Final SWPA operations and organization of AFPAC, extracted from MacArthur Reports, Center for Military History, United States Army 

Military history of the Philippines during World War II
Military units and formations of the United States Army in World War II
Military units and formations established in 1941
History of the Philippines (1898–1946)
United States military in the Philippines
Regional commands of the United States Army